Kim Yoon-ok (born March 26, 1947) is a South Korean academic administrator who was the First Lady of the Republic of Korea.

Early life and career
Kim graduated from Daegu Girls' High School in 1966 and went on to attend Ewha Womans University, where she graduated in 1970 with a Bachelor of Arts in Health Education and Management. She married Lee Myung-bak on December 19, 1970, with whom she has a son and three daughters. Her family runs a construction company in Daegu.

The family lived in Gahoedong prior to her husband's inauguration.

In 1995, she completed the 1st Advanced Leadership Program for Women at her alma mater. In 1996, she completed the 7th Women's Top Management Program at Yonsei University. In 2001, she completed the Leadership Program of the Women's Academy at Sookmyung Women's University.

In 2011, she became the President of the Alumni Association of the Women's Top Management Program at Yonsei University.

Controversy

Familial corruption
 A female relative of the First Lady Kim Yoon-ok, Kim Ok-hui (김옥희), was involved in extorting money in 2008.
 A male relative of Kim Yoon-ok was involved with a lobbyist affiliated with the Jeil Savings Bank. He was later indicted.

References

1947 births
Yonsei University alumni
Ewha Womans University alumni
Lee Myung-bak
Living people
South Korean Presbyterians
First Ladies of South Korea